Abigail Wahiikaahuula Campbell Kawānanakoa (also known as Princess David Kawānanakoa, January 1, 1882 – April 12, 1945) was a politician and Princess of Hawaii.

Life 

Abigail Campbell was born January 1, 1882, in Honolulu. She was born in the same bedroom of the Emma Street mansion which had been the birthplace of Princess Kaʻiulani. Her father was James Campbell, one of the wealthiest industrialists in the Kingdom of Hawaii. Her mother was part-Hawaiian Abigail Kuaihelani Maipinepine Bright.

She graduated from the College of Notre Dame in Belmont, California, in 1900, where she converted from Anglicanism, religion of her parents, to Roman Catholicism.
On January 6, 1902, by virtue of her marriage to Prince David Laʻamea Kahalepouli Kawānanakoa Piʻikoi, she became known as Princess Abigail.

Prince David was one of the heirs of David Kalakaua, monarch of the Kingdom of Hawaiʻi along with Princess Victoria Kaʻiulani and Kalakaua's sister, then Crown Princess Liliuokalani.  Prince David died of pneumonia in 1908. She and Prince David had three children; David Kalākaua Kawānanakoa, Abigail Helen Kapiʻolani Kawānanakoa, and Lydia Liliʻuokalani Kawānanakoa.

Upon the death of her brother-in-law, Prince Jonah Kūhiō Kalanianaʻole in 1922, Princess Abigail effectively became the leader of all native Hawaiians and took an active part in Hawaiʻi's politics as their advocate.  She also assumed the role of heir to the throne as native Hawaiians continued to pray for the return of their sovereignty.  Unlike her brother-in-law Prince Kūhiō, Princess Abigail was a devoted Republican and worked to develop its platforms and pursue its ideals.  In 1924 she became the Republican national committeewoman for Hawaii and served in that capacity for twelve years.  Her prominence on the national stage made Princess Abigail a role model for women in Hawaii.

She died at her Honolulu home on April 12, 1945.

Fiction
She has a short role in Harry Turtledove's novel in Days of Infamy where she is offered the throne of a restored Kingdom of Hawaii.  She refuses, not wishing to be a puppet monarch of the Japanese.

In the 1986 Television movie drama Blood & Orchids inspired by the 1932 Massie Trial, a character based on Abigail Campbell Kawānanakoa is not considered historically accurate.

Gallery

Family tree

References

The Esoteric Curiosa: "Democratic" Princess Of Hawai'i: Princess Abigail Kawānanakoa 

1882 births
1945 deaths
House of Kawānanakoa
Native Hawaiian women in politics
Burials at the Royal Mausoleum (Mauna ʻAla)
Notre Dame de Namur University alumni
Hawaii Republicans
Hawaiian Kingdom people
Converts to Roman Catholicism from Anglicanism
Hawaiian Kingdom Roman Catholics
Hawaiian princesses